Acid Motherly Love is an album by the Acid Mothers Temple & The Melting Paraiso U.F.O., released in 2007 by Riot Season. It is their first as the fixed 4-piece of Tsuyama Atsushi, Higashi Hiroshi, Shimura Koji and Kawabata Makoto.

Track listing

Personnel

 Tsuyama Atsushi – monster bass, voice, acoustic guitar, piano, bamboo flute, cosmic joker
 Higashi Hiroshi – synthesizer, dancin'king
 Shimura Koji – drums, Latino cool
 Kawabata Makoto – electric guitar, hurdy-gurdy, bouzouki, electric sitar, sarangi, tambura, organ, harmonium, violin, electric tambura, glockenspiel, synthesizer, ring modulator, reyong, RDS900, voice, speed guru

Guests

 Stoo Odom – voice, king of beer
 Stefania Muroni – voice
 Nazrin – voice

References

External links
 http://www.discogs.com/Acid-Mothers-Temple-The-Melting-Paraiso-UFO-Acid-Motherly-Love/release/1130679

Acid Mothers Temple albums
2007 albums